Beirne Stadium is a stadium in Smithfield, Rhode Island. It is the home stadium for the Bryant University college football and men's and women's lacrosse programs. The stadium holds 4,400 people and was built in 1999. It was renamed from Bulldog Stadium on September 24, 2016. It has also hosted numerous events for Rhode Island High School State Championships.

The centerpiece of Bryant University's athletic facilities, Beirne Stadium opened in 1999 as Bulldog Stadium to coincide with the varsity debut of Bryant football. On September 24, 2016, it was renamed as part of the David M. '85 and Terry Beirne Stadium Complex. 

The facility received upgrades for the 2018 season that include a new FieldTurf playing surface and permanent lighting banks, making Beirne Stadium the first of the three Football Championship Subdivision stadiums in Rhode Island with permanent lights. The Bryant men's and women's lacrosse programs moved full-time from the Bryant Track & Turf Complex to Beirne Stadium for the 2019 season.

With a seating capacity of 4,400, Beirne Stadium utilizes a design that is usually reserved for larger stadiums, ensuring excellent sight lines and maximum comfort for spectators.  A 3,200-seat permanent bleacher comprises the backdrop for the home side of the field, while 1,200 additional seats are available on the visitor's side.  Three hundred seats in the stadium are equipped with backs and arm rests. The stadium also has its own athletic training center, office space and public rest rooms.

In 2007, the Bulldogs hosted their first ever appearance in the NCAA Division II National Football Championship versus West Chester. In the 2008-2009 school year Bryant University Athletics became a Division I sports program. They belong to the America East for most sports, as well as the Big South for football, and Southland Conference for golf and tennis as of the 2022-23 school year.

Attendance records

See also
 List of NCAA Division I FCS football stadiums

References

External links
 

College football venues
Bryant Bulldogs football
American football venues in Rhode Island
Lacrosse venues in the United States
Soccer venues in Rhode Island
1999 establishments in Rhode Island
Sports venues completed in 1999
College lacrosse venues in the United States
College soccer venues in the United States